The United States Military Academy (USMA) is an undergraduate college in West Point, New York that educates and commissions officers for the United States Army. This list is drawn from alumni of the Military Academy who are veterans of World War I. This includes ... .



World War II veterans
Note: "Class year" refers to the alumni's class year, which usually is the same year they graduated. However, due to the war in Europe, the Class of 1943 graduated early, in January '43, becoming the only class to do so.

 Arthur F. Gorham, Class of 1938, First Commander of the 1/505th PIR, 82nd Airborne.
 Ulysses S. Grant III, Class of 1903. Major General; Head of Protection Branch, Office of Civilian Defense
 Leslie Groves, Class of 1918
 Alfred Gruenther, Class of 1919
 Hubert R. Harmon, Class of 1915
 Albert Hawkins, Class of 1917
 William M. Hoge, Class of 1916
 Geoffrey Keyes, Class of 1913
 John C. H. Lee, Class of 1909
 Lyman Lemnitzer, Class of 1920
 Herbert B. Loper, Class of 1919
 John P. Lucas, Class of 1911
 Vicente Lim, Class of 1914, served under Douglas MacArthur, general Philippine Scouts
 Anthony McAuliffe, Class of 1918
 John P. McConnell, Class of 1932
 Horace L. McBride, Class of 1916, Commander of the 80th Infantry Division
 Lesley J. McNair, Class of 1904
 Joseph T. McNarney, Class of 1915
 Frank Merrill, Class of 1929
 Virgil R. Miller, Class of 1924. Regimental Commander of the 442d Regimental Combat Team
 James Edward Moore, Class of 1924
 Otto L. Nelson, Jr., Class of 1924
 Andrew P. O'Meara, Class of 1930
 Alexander Patch, Class of 1913
 Matthew Ridgway, Class of 1917.
 Edward Rowny, Class of 1941
 John Dale Ryan, Class of 1938
 Antulio Segarra, Class of 1927
 William Hood Simpson, Class of 1909
 Brehon B. Somervell, Class of 1914
 Daniel Isom Sultan, Class of 1907
 Maxwell D. Taylor, Class of 1922
 Thomas J. H. Trapnell, Class of 1927
 William H. Tunner, Class of 1928
 George V. Underwood, Jr., Class 1937
 James Van Fleet, Class of 1915
 Jonathan Wainwright, Class of 1906
 Walton Walker, Class of 1912
 Albert Coady Wedemeyer, Class of 1919
 Raymond Albert Wheeler, Class of 1911
 Major general in United States Army Corps of Engineers developing a transportation network in the Middle East to ship munitions to the Soviet Union (1942–1943); South East Asia Command  on the staff of Admiral Lord Louis Mountbatten, Supreme Allied Commander South East Asia, where duties including directing construction of the Ledo Road (1943–1944); Lieutenant general and Deputy Supreme Allied Commander South East Asia (1944–1945), during which he was the US representative accepting the Japanese surrender in Singapore. Immediately after the war, became the Army Corps of Engineers' overall Chief of Engineers.
 Thomas D. White, Class of 1920
 assistant chief of staff for operations, and then chief of staff, of the Third Air Force at MacDill Field, Florida,(1942–1943); assistant chief of air staff for intelligence Army Air Forces Headquarters at The Pentagon, Virginia (January to August 1944); deputy commander of the Thirteenth Air Force in the Southwest Pacific, taking part in the campaigns of New Guinea, Southern Philippines and Borneo; assumed command of the Seventh Air Force, which had based its headquarters in the Marianas and immediately moved with it to the recently taken Okinawa (June 1945 to beyond war's end). Would later be the Chief of Staff of the United States Air Force.
 Walter K. Wilson Jr., Class of 1929
 during WWII was a Lieutenant colonel in Army Corps of Engineers, Deputy Engineer-in-Chief with the South East Asia Command (1943–1945); Commanding General, Advance Section, U.S. Forces, China Burma India Theater, and Chief of Staff of X Force (the Chinese Army in India) (1945). Would later be the Army Corps of Engineers' overall Chief of Engineers.

References
General

Inline citations

West Point
Academy alumni
Military Academy
World War II
Military Academy